The Year's Best Science Fiction: Thirty-Second Annual Collection is a science fiction anthology edited by Gardner Dozois that was published on July 7, 2015.  It is the 32nd in The Year's Best Science Fiction series.

Contents
The book includes 36 stories, all first published in 2014. The book also includes a summation by Dozois, a brief introduction by Dozois to each story, and a referenced list of honorable mentions for the year. The stories are as follows:

 "The Fifth Dragon" by Ian McDonald (from Reach for Infinity)
 "The Rider" by  Jérôme Cigut (from The Magazine of Fantasy & Science Fiction)
 "The Days of the War, as Red as Blood, as Dark as Bile" by Aliette de Bodard (from Subterranean Online)
 "The Burial of Sir John Mawe at Cassini" by Chaz Brenchley (from Subterranean Online)
 "The Regular" by Ken Liu (from Upgraded)
 "The Woman from the Ocean" by Karl Bunker (from Isaac Asimov's Science Fiction Magazine)
 "Shooting the Apocalypse" by Paolo Bacigalupi (from The End Is Nigh)
 "Weather" by Susan Palwick (from Clarkesworld)
"The Hand Is Quicker" by Elizabeth Bear (from The Book of Robert Silverberg)
 "The Man Who Sold the Moon" by Cory Doctorow (from Hieroglyph)
 "Vladimir Chong Chooses To Die" by Lavie Tidhar  (from Analog Science Fiction and Fact)
 "Beside the Damned River" by D.J. Cockburn (from Interzone)
 "The Colonel" by Peter Watts (from Tor.com)
 "Entanglement" by Vandana Singh (from Hieroglyph)
 "White Curtain" by Pavel Amnuel (from The Magazine of Fantasy & Science Fiction)
 "Slipping" by Lauren Beukes (from Twelve Tomorrows)
 "Passage of Earth" by Michael Swanwick (from Clarkesworld)
 "Amicae Aeternum" by Ellen Klages (from Reach for Infinity)
 "In Babelsberg" by Alastair Reynolds (from Reach for Infinity)
 "Sadness" by Timons Esaias (from Analog)
 "West to East" by Jay Lake (from Subterranean Online)
"Grand Jeté (The Great Leap)" by Rachel Swirsky (from Subterranean Online)
 "Covenent" by Elizabeth Bear (from Hieroglyph)
"Jubilee" Karl Schroeder (from Tor.com)
 "Los Pirates del Mar de Plastico (Pirates of the Plastic Ocean)" by Paul Graham Raven (from Twelve Tomorrows)
 "Red Light, and Rain" Gareth L. Powell (from Solaris Rising 3)
 "Coma Kings" by Jessica Barber (from Lightspeed)
 "The Prodigal Son" by Allen M. Steele (from Isaac Asimov's Science Fiction Magazine)
 "God Decay" by Rich Larson (from Upgraded)
"Blood Wedding" Robert Reed (from Isaac Asimov's Science Fiction Magazine)
 "The Long Haul From the ANNALS OF TRANSPORTATION, The Pacific Monthly, May 2009" by Ken Liu (from Clarkesworld)
 "Shadow Flock" by Greg Egan (from Coming Soon Enough)
"Thing and Sick" by Adam Roberts (from Solaris Rising 3)
 "Communion" by Mary Anne Mohanraj (from Clarkesworld)
 "Someday" by James Patrick Kelly (from Isaac Asimov's Science Fiction Magazine)
 "Yesterday’s Kin" by Nancy Kress (from Tachyon)

References

2015 anthologies
32
St. Martin's Press books
2010s science fiction works